The 1394th Transportation Brigade is a United States Army unit subordinate to the 377th Theater Sustainment Command.

As of 2017 the following units are subordinated to the 1394th Transportation Brigade Command:

 Headquarters and Headquarters Detachment 
 1395th Deployment and Distribution Support Battalion, in JB Lewis-McChord , Tacoma, Washington
 647th Transportation Detachment, in Victor L. Kandle Hall United States Army Reserve Center | Tacoma, Washington
 1397th Deployment and Distribution Support Battalion, in MOTCO United States Army Reserve Center  | Concord, California
 502nd Transportation Detachment, in Los Alamitos Joint Forces Training Base  | Los Alamitos, California
 Indirect reporting
 643rd Transportation Detachment, in Fairchild Air Force Base Armed Forces Reserve Center  |  Fairchild Air Force Base, Spokane, Washington
 931st Transportation Detachment, in Daniels Hall United States Army Reserve Center  | Sherman Oaks, California
 1180th Transportation Detachment, in El Monte United States Army Reserve Center  | El Monte, California
 1188th Transportation Detachment, in Daniels Hall United States Army Reserve Center  | Sherman Oaks, California

References

Transportation units and formations of the United States Army
Brigades of the United States Army